Cape Anderson is a cape which marks the east side of the entrance to Mill Cove on the south coast of Laurie Island, in the South Orkney Islands. Charted in 1903 by the Scottish National Antarctic Expedition under Bruce, who named it for his secretary, Nan Anderson.

See also
Florence Rock

References

Headlands of the South Orkney Islands